This Is Cinta is an Indonesian romantic drama film released on February 12, 2015 and directed by Sony Gaokasak, the shooting locations were in Bogor and  Jakarta in Indonesia and also in Auckland, New Zealand. Adrian portrayed male lead role named Farel. While Kato played female lead role named Rachel. Both characters are storied to always want to be together but are constrained by circumstances that had never they suspected.

Plot 
Indonesian kindergarten students Rachel and Farel, who have the same extracurricular activity of music, live in neighboring apartments. A problem is that at times, Rachel would suffer while hanging out with Farel, prompting Rachel's helicopter mother to avoid them meeting, though Rachel proudly rebels. One day, Farel promises to Rachel that he will bring her to a majestic castle he imagines of. In the extracurricular, a recurring song is "This is Cinta" ("This is Love"): Rachel sings, while Farel plays the piano.

It has been 12 years since they separate. Farel is a college student and soon-to-be pianist, while Rachel, still trapped within his mother, is being forced to form a romantic bond with a man named Nicko, with whom she can't. At a talent show, Farel reveals that he is motivated to be a pianist because of Rachel, and still keeps his castle sketch. Rachel sees this on TV, and they reunite the next morning. At the talent show, Farel succeeds to the final round, and the host asks Rachel to duet with him in said round.

Rachel's mother discovers her rehearsing, and grounds her. Rachel and her parents have a long argument about her being an independent 17-year-old adult. That night, Nicko brings her out— specifically, trapping her at a warehouse to rape her. Rachel texts Farel, who brings Rachel to flee. While chasing the two, Nicko crashes Farel's borrowed motorbike, critically injuring Rachel and putting Farel in asystole. Nicko is arrested, and Rachel's parents regret themselves. As the two near Heaven, Farel's desires drag him back to life, while Rachel tearfully walks away from life. To attract Rachel, Farel plays "This is Cinta" nearby her hospital room; he succeeds. As Rachel is discharged, the two fly to Auckland, where the majestic castle is revealed to exist amid a rural field.

Cast

Lead roles
 Yuki A. Kato as Rachel
 Shawn Adrian as Farrel
 Aida Nurmala as Rachel's mother
 Fahira Alidrus as Sasa
 Fandi Christian as Nicko
 Ari Wibowo as Rachel's father
 Yunique Pricsyilla as Farel's mother

Supporting roles
 Sandrinna M. Skornicki
 Richele Georgeti Skornicki
 Alwi Assegaf
 Indra Bekti
 Yuka Idol
 Emmi Lemu
 Mc Danny
 Mo Sidiq
 Yama Carlos
 703 Richard
 Joshua Pandelaki
 Monica Oemardy
 Uus
 Faradilla Yoshy

References

2015 films
2015 romantic drama films
Indonesian romantic drama films
Films set in 2002